The 2019 Betard Wrocław FIM Speedway Grand Prix of Poland was the fifth race of the 2019 Speedway Grand Prix season. It took place on August 3rd at the Olympic Stadium in Wrocław, Poland.

Riders 
Second reserve Max Fricke replaced Greg Hancock. The Speedway Grand Prix Commission nominated Makym Drabik as the wild card, and Przemysław Liszka and Mateusz Cierniak both as Track Reserves.

Results 
The Grand Prix was won by Bartosz Zmarzlik, who beat Martin Vaculík, Leon Madsen and Janusz Kołodziej in the final. Emil Sayfutdinov had initially topped the scoring charts along with Kołodziej, however he was eliminated in the semi-finals. It was the fifth Grand Prix win of Zmarzlik's career.

Zmarzlik's win resulted in him moving joint-top of the overall standings, tied on 61 points with Sayfutdinov and Madsen.

Heat details

Intermediate classification

References 

Poland
Speedway Grand Prix
Grand
2019